The Minister of State at the Department of Children, Equality, Disability, Integration and Youth is a junior ministerial post in the Department of Children, Equality, Disability, Integration and Youth of the Government of Ireland who performs functions delegated by the Minister for Children, Equality, Disability, Integration and Youth. The Minister of State does not hold cabinet rank.

There are currently two Ministers of State, who were appointed in 2022:
 Anne Rabbitte, TD – Minister of State with special responsibility for Disability. Rabbitte is also Minister of State at the Department of Health, where she also has responsibility for disability.
 Joe O'Brien, TD – Minister of State with special responsibility for Integration

List of Parliamentary Secretaries to the Minister for the Gaeltacht

List of Ministers of State

References

Children
Department of Children, Equality, Disability, Integration and Youth